Presidential elections were held in Indonesia on 9 July 2014, with former general Prabowo Subianto contesting the elections against the governor of Jakarta, Joko Widodo; incumbent president Susilo Bambang Yudhoyono was constitutionally barred from seeking a third term in office. On 22 July the General Elections Commission (KPU) announced Joko Widodo's victory. He and his vice president, Jusuf Kalla, were sworn-in on 20 October 2014, for a 5-year term.

According to the 2008 election law, only parties or coalitions controlling 20% of DPR seats or winning 25% of the popular votes in the 2014 parliamentary elections are eligible to nominate a candidate. This law was challenged in the Constitutional Court, but in late January 2014, the court ruled that the requirement would stand for this election. No party exceeded the threshold in the 2014 legislative elections; therefore, two coalitions were formed.

Arrangement for the election

Arrangements for the conduct of elections in Indonesia are carried out under the supervision of the KPU. The presidential elections in 2014 were carried out under the 2008 election law (Undang-undang, or UU) No. 42 on the election of a president and vice president.

Arrangements for nominations

An important requirement, set out in Law No. 42 of 2008 (Clause 9), is that nominations of candidates for the presidential election may only be made by a party (or coalition of parties) which has at least 20% of the seats in the national parliament (the DPR, or the Dewan Perwakilan Rakyat) or which received 25% of national votes in the previous national legislative election for the DPR. In practice, these conditions set a rather high bar for nomination. The likelihood is that only candidates supported by one of the major parties, perhaps with some support from several of the minor parties, will be able to meet the conditions for nomination. Among other things, the effect of this requirement is likely to be a strict limit on the number of candidates who will be able to stand for the presidency.

Voting system 

Indonesia worked towards implementing e-voting the 2014 general elections using electronic identity cards (e-KTP), which had been tested in six districts/cities, namely Padang, West Sumatra; Denpasar, Bali; Jembrana, Bali; Yogyakarta, Java; Cilegon, West Java; and Makassar, (South Sulawesi).

However, the system was not ready for the election. Therefore, voters still voted on paper by punching a hole in one of the two candidates' photograph, number, or name. The ballots were then collected and counted at the village level, then city/regency level, province level, and finally the national level.

Political parties

Candidates for president are nominated as individuals (along with a vice-presidential running partner); however, support from the main political parties is likely to play a crucial role in influencing the result. Partly for this reason, the highly changeable map of political parties in Indonesia contributes to the uncertainty of political trends in the run-up to the presidential election. In recent years, the number of political parties contesting major elections (for both national and regional parliaments and the presidential elections) has varied considerably.

 In 2004, 24 parties contested the national elections and 16 secured enough seats to be represented in the national parliament.
 In 2009, 38 parties contested the national elections and nine secured enough seats to be represented in the national parliament.
 In 2014, 12 parties contested the national legislative elections on 9 April, and three more were authorised to run candidates in Aceh. (Brief details of the parties are listed at the relevant page on the website of the KPU.) It is expected that candidates for president who hope to mount an effective campaign will need to secure the support of at least one of the major parties as well as several other smaller parties.  Details of the twelve main national parties who qualified to mount nationwide political campaigns are as follows:

Summary of registered parties support

 Parties that are in light grey shows that they do not pass the 2014 Parliamentary Threshold of 2.5% of the national legislative vote. They were also initially barred participation in the next election for the same reason.
 The leader of Democratic Party and sitting President Susilo Bambang Yudhoyono was officially neutral in the election.

Candidates

Nominated

Previously considered potential 
Before the national legislative elections on 9 April 2014, the following candidates had declared their intention to run for president. Following the legislative elections, these candidates were unable to reach the threshold.

Polling
NOTE: The quality of polling in Indonesia varies considerably. Furthermore, some of the polling institutions provide little information about their polling methods.  The data set out below should therefore be treated with care.

NOTE: See cautionary note at the top of this table.

Timeline
NOTE: The following timeline refers to some dates which refer to the national parliamentary elections due in mid-2014 as well as other events in addition to the presidential election.  These dates are noted because events leading up to the national parliamentary elections will, in the minds of voters and party organisers, be closely linked to the presidential election.

Counting and results 
Following the election on 9 July 2014, Joko Widodo announced his victory based on quick counts of votes from several zones; most of these independent pollsters indicated a Joko Widodo victory (52–53% of votes to Prabowo's 46–48%). Prabowo also claimed victory, citing other polls. As the official count continued, the KPU released scans of the tally (C1) forms from each polling station on its official website, allowing downloads of the official data.

In the lead up to the official announcement of the official results by the KPU, Prabowo pushed for the Commission to delay the announcement by two weeks, allowing his party to investigate claimed manipulations of the voting process. This request was denied. The Prabowo camp also called for a new vote in some zones. However, several Prabowo supporters congratulated Joko Widodo on his election or conceded the election. PAN politician Hanafi Rais, writing three days before the results were announced, sent a press release which stated: "We congratulate Bapak Joko Widodo and Jusuf Kalla — who will helm the national leadership for the next five years". The same day, Prabowo's campaign manager Mahfud M.D. returned his mandate to Prabowo, stating that the election was over; he was replaced by Lt. Gen. Yunus Yosfiah on 22 July 2014.

Out of fear that inter-party tension could lead to riots such as those which led to the downfall of former president Suharto, the Indonesian government deployed over 250,000 police officers throughout the country. In central Jakarta, hundreds of police were stationed – particularly around the KPU's offices. Following bomb threats against Jakarta City Hall, after the KPU's announcement military officials tightened security around it Commission's headquarters. A group of Prabowo supporters staged a non-violent protest near the offices.

Prabowo's withdrawal
On 22 July 2014, the day that the KPU was due to announce its official tally, Prabowo withdrew from the recapitulation process after having insisted on his victory since the initial quick counts were released. He attributed this withdrawal to Indonesia "failing in its duty to democracy" because of "massive cheating that is structured and systematic", and stated that he and Hatta "exercise our constitutional right to reject the presidential election and declare it unconstitutional". His speech, aired live, implied that he would challenge the results in the Constitutional Court (Mahkamah Konstitusi). Later reports indicated confusion over whether Prabowo had resigned from the election or simply rejected the count.

According to Douglas Ramage, Managing Director for Indonesia at BowerGroupAsia, this was the first time since reformasi (the Reformation) began in 1998 that the legitimacy of the election process has been questioned; he declared that the country was entering "uncharted territory". The legality of a Prabowo challenge is questionable, as – if he withdrew – he is no longer considered a presidential candidate. If he can make the challenge, according to The Jakarta Post, the gap between the two candidates is sufficient to make such a challenge difficult. Under the presidential election law, Prabowo could face up to six years in prison and a 100 billion rupiah ($10 million) fine for withdrawing.
 
Following the announcement, the value of the Indonesian rupiah dropped by 0.3%, and the JSX Composite fell by 0.9%. Observers denied Prabowo's allegations of cheating, finding that the elections were "generally fair and free"; Maswadi Rauf of the University of Indonesia stated that there was "no sign of significant fraud", and that Prabowo's withdrawal simply reflected "the real attitudes of the elite, who are not yet ready to accept losing". In a survey, 90% of the Indonesian populace were satisfied with the KPU's handling of the election.

Announcement and reaction
After Prabowo's withdrawal, his witnesses also left the announcement ceremony. However, the official tally continued; the Commission chief, Husni Kamil Manik, said that they had already fulfilled their obligations by inviting the witnesses. A victory for Joko Widodo was expected, and realised hours later, although the initially planned 4:00 p.m. announcement was delayed for four hours. The KPU gave Joko Widodo a victory of 53.15% of the vote (representing 70.99 million voters), to Prabowo's 46.85% (62.57 million votes). This was the closest vote in the history of free elections in the country; the two previous elections, in 2004 and 2009, had been landslide victories for Yudhoyono.

The Prabowo camp continued to reject the KPU's count, announcing that they trusted the count provided by the PKS, which gave a Prabowo victory, more than the Commission's. Prabowo's camp later stated that it intended to report the KPU to the police for continuing its recapitulation despite calls for a delay and questions of the vote's validity.

After the announcement, Joko Widodo stated that growing up under the authoritarian and corrupt New Order, he would have never expected someone with a lower-class background to become president. The New York Times reported him as saying, "now, it's quite similar to America, yes? There is the American dream, and here we have the Indonesian dream.". Joko Widodo was the first Indonesian president to not be from the military or the political elite, and the political commentator Salim Said gave the popular view of the politician "someone who is our neighbour, who decided to get into politics and run for president".

The Singaporean prime minister, Lee Hsien Loong, posted his congratulations on Twitter minutes after the election, expressing hope that Joko Widodo would work towards improving relations between the two countries. Tony Abbott, Prime Minister of Australia, stated that Joko Widodo's election was a "milestone" for the development of democracy in Indonesia, and stated his hope that the two countries' relations could be reinforced following a decline caused by espionage scandals and human trafficking.  US President Barack Obama also congratulated Jokowi and is also willing to improve relations between Indonesia and the US. However, Prabowo asked for world leaders to withhold congratulatory statements to Jokowi.

Appeal

A member of the Prabowo-Hatta campaign team outlined the eight final moves that Prabowo plans to take to overturn the election result. These are:
 File a lawsuit over the election result with the Constitutional Court
 Report alleged ethical violations by the KPU to the Election Organisers Ethics Council (DKPP).
 File a report with the Election Supervisory Committee (Panwaslu).
 Report electoral violations to the police.
 Making a report to the Ombudsman.
 File a report with the State Administrative Court (PTUN) asking for the KPU on the election result to be annulled.
 Political manoeuvring within the People's Representative Council (DPR) by establishing a Presidential Election Special Committee to evaluate the performance of the KPU. The manoeuvring was done by parties within Prabowo-Hatta's coalition.
 A class action.

Prabowo Subianto took an appeal against the election result to the Constitutional Court of Indonesia, alleging "structured, systematic and massive" violations and that up to 24.1 million votes were "troubled". The first hearing was on 6 August. Hundreds of supporters were present outside the court. On 21 August the court delivered a unanimous 9–0 verdict in favour of rejecting all aspects of the appeal. A spokesperson for Subianto stated that his team did not consider the ruling fair, but they would accept the court's judgement. On the same day, the Election Organizers Ethics Council (DKPP) ruled that there had been some ethical violations. Of the nine local election commissioners dismissed for taking bribes, four of them took money from Prabowo's Gerindra Party.

Official results

Overview

National

Overseas

Quick count results

References

Indonesia
2014
Indonesia politics-related lists